Abha Dawesar (born 1 January 1974) is an Indian-born novelist writing in English. Her novels include Babyji, Family Values, That Summer in Paris, and Miniplanner. Her 2005 novel Babyji won the Lambda Literary Award for Lesbian Fiction and the Stonewall Book Award.

Biography 
Abha Dawesar was born in New Delhi. She moved to the United States to attend Harvard University, where she graduated in 1995.

Before publishing her award-winning second novel, Babyji (2005), Dawesar was working at a global financial services firm in Manhattan. She quit her job to devote her time to writing.

Dawesar has been exhibiting photography, visual, and video art since she was a student at Harvard. Her work has been exhibited at various galleries and museums in the United States and abroad.

In 2010, she wrote part of the screenplay for the film Love and the Cities, directed by Rodrigo Bernardo.

Since 2013, Dawesar has been speaking on issues around digital technology and its effects on social behavior and experience.

Awards 

 Fiction Fellow, New York Foundation for the Arts (2000)
 Lambda Literary Award for Lesbian Fiction, for Babyji (2005)
 Stonewall Book Award, American Library Association, for Babyji (2006)

Bibliography

Novels
 Miniplanner (2000) (published in India by Penguin Books under the title The Three of Us)
 Babyji (2005) (winner of the Stonewall Book Award and Lambda Literary Award, 2006)
 That Summer in Paris (2006)
 Family Values (2011)
 Sensorium (2012)
 Madison Square Park (2016)

Short stories

 The Good King in

Personal life
She lives in New York City.

References

External links
  Not Found
 An interview with Abha Dawesar
 
 Abha Dawesar: Life in the "digital now" (TEDGlobal 2013)

1974 births
American novelists of Indian descent
American women novelists
American women writers of Indian descent
Harvard University alumni
Indian emigrants to the United States
Lambda Literary Award for Lesbian Fiction winners
Stonewall Book Award winners
Living people
21st-century Indian women writers
21st-century Indian writers
21st-century Indian novelists
Novelists from Delhi
People from New Delhi
Women writers from Delhi
21st-century American women